The San Diego Padres are a Major League Baseball (MLB) franchise based in San Diego, California. The Padres were granted a Major League team in 1968, taking their name from the minor-league San Diego Padres of the Pacific Coast League. Through the end of the 2022 regular season, they have played 8,520 games, winning 3,952, losing 4,568, and tying two for a winning percentage of .464. This list documents the superlative records and accomplishments of team members during their tenure as members of Major League Baseball's National League.

Tony Gwynn holds the most franchise records as of the end of the 2022 season, with 15, including best single-season batting average, most career hits, and most career triples. He is followed by Randy Jones, who holds thirteen records, including most career shutouts and the single-season loss record.

Trevor Hoffman is ranked fifth in Major League Baseball for most saves in a single season, while ranking second in all-time saves, recording 601 over his 18-year career (552 as a member of the Padres). Offensively, Gwynn has the 18th highest hit total in Major League history, recording 3,141 hits over a 19-year Major League career.

Table key

Individual career records
Batting statistics; pitching statistics

Individual single-season records
Batting statistics; pitching statistics

Individual single-game recordsSource:Team season recordsSource:Team all-time recordsSource:''

See also
Baseball statistics
San Diego Padres award winners and league leaders

References

External links

Records
San Diego Padres